Jakob Altenberg (18751944) was an Austrian businessman and picture frame dealer. Altenberg, who was Jewish by birth, was a business partner of the young Adolf Hitler in his Vienna period (190913).

Early life 
Jakob Altenberg was born in Hrymailiv, near Skalat, eastern Galicia-Lodomeria (in present-day Ukraine), in 1875. He was the son of a Jewish couple, Moses and Sarah Altenberg.

As a young man, Altenberg travelled to Vienna, where he learned gilding. Later, he cast off his Jewish faith, and in 1902 married a Catholic Viennese innkeeper's daughter. The marriage produced two children, daughter Adele (b. 1896) and son Jakob Jr. (b. 1902).

In 1898, Altenberg opened his first store as a frame dealer and goldsmith at 37 . Within a few years he became a successful operator of a small framing workshop and a thriving chain of frame shops and art, in which frames were offered for sale, along with pictures and small art objects (characters, etc.). In addition to its headquarters in the Wiedner Hauptstraße, three other branches were later established, including a business on Vienna's largest shopping street, .

Relationship with Hitler 
From 1909 to 1913, Altenberg was in business contact with the young Adolf Hitler, who lived at that time as a painter in Vienna. Until his move to Germany in May 1913, Hitler supplied Altenberg's stores on a regular basis with his own paintings, mostly watercolours, which Altenberg used as filler for the frames on display. The relationship between Hitler and Altenberg was good regardless of Altenberg's Jewish ancestry, and Altenberg is reported to have said that he never heard Hitler utter an anti-Semitic remark.

Later life 
After the Anschluss in 1938, Altenberg's business was "Aryanized", his property was confiscated, and he was reduced to a minimum pension. He sold the remainder of Hitler's paintings, for a small sum, to the main archive of the NSDAP. He escaped deportation after 1942 because his wife was Aryan. He died in Vienna in 1944.

References 

1875 births
1944 deaths
People from Ternopil Oblast
People from the Kingdom of Galicia and Lodomeria
Austro-Hungarian Jews
Ukrainian Jews
Jews from Galicia (Eastern Europe)
Austrian people of Ukrainian-Jewish descent
19th-century Austrian businesspeople
20th-century Austrian businesspeople
Austrian merchants
Austrian businesspeople
Secular Jews
Austro-Hungarian businesspeople